The 2000-2001 Turkish First Football League was the 43rd edition of top-flight professional football in Turkey. The season saw many turning points for different teams. Galatasaray, the team that dominated the last decade and won the UEFA Cup, lost the title to Fenerbahçe SK for the first time in five seasons. Fenerbahçe reached to success with Mustafa Denizli, the first Turkish manager to win the league for Fenerbahçe. Southeastern side Gaziantepspor fought for the title for a long time during the season under the manager Erdoğan Arıca and Sakıp Özberk. They lost their hopes for title, when, in the 29th fixture, Fenerbahçe SK defeated them 4-3 at Şükrü Saracoğlu. Gaziantepspor were 3-0 ahead in the half-time.

League table

Results

Top scorers

References 
 turkfutbolu.net by Alper Duruk
Turkey - List of final tables (RSSSF)

Süper Lig seasons
Turkey
1